Luar na Lubre is a Celtic music ensemble from Galicia, Spain.

Etymology
Luar is Galician for moonlight; lubre is a magical forest in which the Celtic druids cast their spells.

Performances
During its career, this musical group has spread Galician music and culture. The band became famous worldwide after Mike Oldfield took interest in their music. Oldfield fell in love with their song "O son do ar" ("The Sound of the Air", composed by Bieito Romero). Oldfield's cover is on his Voyager album, entitled "Song of the Sun". In 1992 he offered help in their worldwide tour. Their tour together was called Tubular Bells 3. Now it is one of the most famous groups from Galicia. Their first singer Rosa Cedrón is also featured with Mike Oldfield in some songs from his live concert at Horse Guards Parade, near St James's Park, London. Rosa Cedrón left the band in 2005 and Sara Vidal became the new singer. In 2010, the group's leader, Bieito Romero, said the group was "fully fit".

The group recorded a version of "Gerdundula" by Status Quo.

The Spanish folk metal band Mägo de Oz made a cover of Luar na Lubre's song "Memoria da Noite."
The Spanish epic metal band Runic made a cover of Luar na Lubre's song "Nau".

Their most famous singles are "Memoria da Noite", "Os Animais", "O son do ar", "Tu gitana" and "Chove en Santiago". Most of their lyrics are in the Galician language. Their song "Nau", written by Bieito Romero is about Galicia as a ship with no direction.

The second part of the song "Downstream" by Shira Kammen (on her album "Music of waters") used "O son do ar". Kammen's cover appears in the video game Braid.

Members
Current members
Irma Macías – Vocals
Bieito Romero – Bagpipes, accordion and zanfoña
Antía Ameixeiras - Violin
Patxi Bermudez – Bodhran, drum and djembe
Pedro Valero – Acoustic guitar
Xavier Ferreiro – Latin percussion and effects
Xan Cerqueiro – Flutes

Former members
Ana Espinosa – Vocals
Rosa Cedrón – Vocals (1996–2005)
Sara Louraço Vidal – Vocals (2005–2011)
Paula Rey – Vocals (2011-2016)
Daniel Sisto – Acoustic guitar
Eduardo Coma – Fiddle
Xavier Cedron – Fiddle
Xulio Varela – Bouzouki, horn, tarrañolas and tambourine
Wafir Gibril  – Ud

Discography
 Vieiras e Vieiros (2020)
 Ribeira Sacra (2018)
 Extra: Mundi (2015)
 Torre de Breoghán (2014)
 Sons da lubre nas noites de luar (2012)
 Mar Maior (2012)
 Solsticio (2010)
 Ao vivo (2009)
 Camiños da fin da terra (2007)
 Saudade (2005)
 Hai un paraiso (2004)
 Espiral (2002)
 XV aniversario (2001)
 Cabo do mundo (1999)
 Plenilunio (1997, re-issued 2002 with bonus live tracks from 2000)
 Ara Solis (1993)
 Beira atlántica (1990)
 O son do ar (1988)

See also
 Galician traditional music

References

External links
Luar na Lubre's official website
YouTube Channel

Celtic music groups
Musicians from Galicia (Spain)
Galician-language singers
Galician traditional music groups